William Carroll "Bud" Black (July 9, 1932 – October 2, 2005) was a professional baseball pitcher. He played parts of three seasons in Major League Baseball for the Detroit Tigers.

Black was signed by the St. Louis Browns as an amateur free agent in 1950, then traded to the Tigers in a multi-player deal on August 14, 1952. In all he appeared in 10 games, five as a starter, won two, lost three, pitched 32 innings, and had an earned run average of 4.22.

External links

 Retrosheet

Major League Baseball pitchers
Detroit Tigers players
Aberdeen Pheasants players
Pine Bluff Judges players
San Antonio Missions players
Little Rock Travelers players
Oakland Oaks (baseball) players
Charleston Senators players
Augusta Tigers players
Birmingham Barons players
Shreveport Sports players
Baseball players from St. Louis
1932 births
2005 deaths
American expatriate baseball players in Panama